Often called lunar mansion, a lunar station or lunar house is a segment of the ecliptic through which the Moon passes in its orbit around the Earth. The concept was used by several ancient cultures as part of their calendrical system.

Stations in different cultures
In general, though not always, the zodiac is divided into 27 or 28 segments relative to the vernal equinox point or the fixed stars – one for each day of the lunar month. (A sidereal month lasts about  days.) The Moon's position is charted with respect to those fixed segments. Since the Moon's position at any given stage will vary according to Earth's position in its own orbit, lunar stations are an effective system for keeping track of the passage of seasons.

Various cultures have used sets of lunar stations astrologically; for example, the Jyotisha astrological nakshatras of Hindu culture, the Arabic manzils (manazil al-qamar), the Twenty-Eight Mansions of Chinese astronomy, and the 36 decans of Egyptian astronomy. Western astrology does not use stations, but each zodiac sign covers two or three. The Chinese system groups houses into four groups related to the seasons.

The concept of lunar stations is thought to originate in Babylonian astronomy. Tester (1987) explains that they appear in Hellenistic astrology in the 2nd-century list of fixed stars in the Katarchai by Maximus, the Arabic lists by Alchandri and Ibn Abī l-Rijāl, and a similar Coptic list with Greek names.

Tester believes that though they were known in the Vedic period of India, all lists "seem to betray" transmission through Greek sources. Though pointing out that the Babylonians had well established lunar groupings by the 6th century BC, he also notes that the 28 station "scheme was derived via Egyptian magic by the linking of the lists of lucky and unlucky days of the lunar month with the hemerologies and with the zodiac."

Chinese 宿 xiù

The 28 Lunar Mansions, or more precisely lodgings are the Chinese and East Asian form of the lunar stations. They can be considered as the equivalent to the Western zodiac, although the 28 stations reflect the movement of the Moon through a sidereal month rather than the Sun in a tropical year. In their final form, they embodied the astral forms of the Four Symbols: two real and two legendary animals important in traditional Chinese culture, such as feng shui.

Indian nakshatra

The nakshatras (or more precisely nákṣatra, lit. "stars") are the Indian form of lunar stations. They usually number 27 but sometimes 28 and their names are related to the most prominent constellations in each sector. According to the modern tradition they start from a point on the ecliptic precisely opposite the star Spica (Sanskrit: Chitrā) and develop eastwards but the oldest traditional method was to use the Vernal Equinox point as the starting point of Ashvini Nakshatra. In classical Hindu mythology, the creation of the nakshatras is attributed to Daksha. They were wives of Chandra, the moon god. The nakshatras of traditional bhartiya astronomy are based on a list of 28 asterisms found in the Atharvaveda (AVŚ 19.7) and also in the Shatapatha Brahmana. The first astronomical text that lists them is the Vedanga Jyotisha. The stations are important parts of Indian astrology.

Arabic manzil
In the traditional Arabic astrological system, the new moon was seen to move through 28 distinct manāzil (singular: manzil "house") during the normal solar year, each manzil lasting, therefore, for about 13 days. One or more manazil were then grouped into a nawaa (plural anwaa) which were tied to a given weather pattern. In other words, the yearly pattern was divided in the following manner: A year was divided into anwaa, each of which was made up of one more manazil, which were associated with a dominant star or constellation. These stars and constellations were sometimes, but not always, connected in some way to constellations in the Zodiac. Moreover, as the anwaa repeat on a regular, solar cycle, they can be correlated to fixed points on the Gregorian calendar.

The following table is a breakdown of the anwaa and their position on the Gregorian calendar.

{| class="wikitable"
|-
! Manzil!! Associated Nawaa!! Significant Stars/Constellations !! Zodiac Constellations!! Begins on
|-
| Sharaṭān || Al Thurayyā || Sheratan in Aries || -- || 17 May
|-
| Pleione || Al Thurayyā || Pleione in the Pleiades|| --|| 31 May
|-
| Al-Buṭayn || Al Thurayyā || Albatain in the Pleiades|| --|| 13 June
|-
| Al-Tuwaibe' || Al Tuwaibe'  || Aldebaran || --|| 26 June
|-
| Al-Haq‘ah || Al Jawzaa/Gemini || Haq‘ah in Orion || Gemini || 9 July
|-
| Al-Han‘ah || Al Jawzaa/Gemini|| Alhena in Gemini|| Gemini || 22 July
|-
| Murzim || Murzim || Canis Major || --|| 4 August 
|-
| An Nathra || Kulaibain || An Nathra || --|| 17 August 
|-
| Alterf || Suhail|| Alterf in Leo || Leo || 30 August
|-
| Dschuba || Suhail || Dschuba || Scorpio || 12 September 
|-
| Azzubra || Suhail ||   ||   || 25 September
|-
| Assarfa || Suhail ||   ||   || 8 October
|-
| Auva || Al Wasm || Auva || Virgo || 21 October 
|-
| Simak || Al Wasm || Spica || -- || 3 November 
|-
| Syrma || Al Wasm ||   || -- || 16 November 
|-
| Az Zubana || Al Wasm || Acuben || Cancer || 29 November 
|-
| Akleel "The Crown" || Murabaania || Corona Borealis || -- || 12 December
|-
| Qalb al Akraab || Murabaania || Antares || Scorpio || 25 December 
|-
| Shaula || Murabaania || Shaula || Scorpio || 3 January 
|-
| Al Naam || Ash Shabt || Ascella and Nunki || Sagittarius || 16 January 
|-
| Al Baldaah || Ash Shabt ||Pi Saggitari||Sagittarius|| 29 January 
|-
| Saad Al Thabib || The Three Saads || Beta Capricorni || Capricornus|| 11 February
|-
| Saad Balaa || The Three Saads || Saad Balaa || --|| 26 February 
|-
| Saad Al Saud || The Three Saads || Saadalsud || Aquarius || 11 March 
|-
| Saad Al Akhbia || Hameemain || Sadachbia || -- || 24 March 
|-
| Almuqaddam || Hameemain || Almuqaddam || -- || 6 April 
|-
| Al Muakhar || Al Tharaeen || Pollux || Gemini and Aquarius (in the Arab system) || 19 April 
|-
| Alrescha || Al Tharaeen|| Alrescha || Gemini and Aquarius (in the Arab system)|| 2 May 
|-
|}

The dates above are approximate; notice that there are 2 days missing from a solar year in the table above.

{| class="wikitable"
|+Lunar station - [Manazilu ʾl-Qamar منازل القمر]
according to Islamic astronomical system (Arab sources)
! rowspan="2" |Station
! rowspan="2" |Period(approx. by Arab sources)
! rowspan="2" |Starting degreeof Sidereal Zodiac sign
! rowspan="2" |Constellation
! rowspan="2" |ʿAmal عمل(lit. "doer"/ "doer of the deed")(The Angel ruling the Manazil and ḥurūf)
! rowspan="2" |Lunar station[Manazilu ʾl-Qamar منازل القمر]
| colspan="4" |Arabic alphabet [ḥurūf حروف] - Abjadī Order
|-
! Transliteration
! Letter Name
! Letter Value(Abjad numerals)
! Letter(Isolated Form)
|-
| 1st
| 5 April
| 0° 0' 
| rowspan="3" | Aries 

|ʾIsrāfīl 
إِسْرَافِيل
|ʾAsh-Sharaṭayn / ʾAn-Naṭḥ
ﭐلْشَّرَطَيْن  \ ﭐلْنّطح
|ā /  ’ (also ʾ )
|alif 
|1
|أ
|-
|2nd
|18 April
|12° 51' 
|Jibrāʾīl

جِبْرَائِيل
|ʾAl-Buṭayn
ﭐلْبُطَيْن
|b
|bāʾ
|2
|ب
|-
|3rd
|1 May
|25° 43' 
|Kalkāʾīl*
كلكائيل
|ʾAth-Thurayyā

ﭐلْثُّرَيَّا
|j (also ǧ, g)
|jīm
|3
|ج
|-
|4th
|14 May
|8° 34'
| rowspan="2" |Taurus 
 
|Dardāʾīl*
دردَائِيل
|ʾAd-Dabarān
ﭐلْدَّبَرَان
|d
|dāl
|4
|د
|-
|5th
|27 May
|21° 26' 
|Dūryāʾīl*
دوريَائِيل
|ʾAl-Haqʿah

ﭐلْهَقْعَة
|h
|hāʾ
|5
|ه
|-
|6th
|9 June
|4° 17' 
| rowspan="2" |Gemini 
 
|Fatmāʾīl*
فتمَائِيل
|ʾAl-Hanʿah
ﭐلْهَنْعَة
|w / ū
|wāw
|6
|و
|-
|7th
|22 June
|17° 9'
|Sharfāʾīl*

شرفَائِيل
|ʾAdh-Dhirāʿ
ﭐلْذِّرَاعْ
|z
|zayn / zāy
|7
|ز
|-
|8th
|5 July
|0° 0' 
| rowspan="3" |Cancer 
 

|Tankafīl*
تنكفيل

|ʾAn-Nathrah
ﭐلْنَّثْرَة
|ḥ
|ḥāʾ
|8
|ح
|-
|9th
|18 July
|12° 51' 
|ʾIsmāʿīl*
إِسْمَاعِيل

|ʾAṭ-Ṭarf / ʾAṭ-Ṭarfah
ﭐلْطَّرْف  \ ﭐلْطَّرْفَة
|ṭ
|ṭāʾ
|9
|ط
|-
|10th
|31 July
|25° 43' 
|Kīṭāʾīl*
كيطَائِيل

|ʾAl-Jab'hah
ﭐلْجَبْهَة
|y , ī / ā , ỳ
|yāʾ / alif maqṣūrah
|10
|ي \ ى
|-
|11th
|14 Aug
|8° 34' 
| rowspan="2" |Leo 
 
بُرْجُ ﭐلْأَسَد 
|Ḥarūzāʾīl*
حروزَائِيل

|ʾAz-Zubrah / ʾAl-Kharātān
ﭐلْزُّبْرَة  \ ﭐلْخرَاتَان
|k
|kāf
|20
|ك
|-
|12th
|27 Aug
|21° 26' 
|Ṭāṭāʾīl*
طَاطَائِيل

|ʾAṣ-Ṣarfah
ﭐلْصَّرْفَة
|l
|lām
|30
|ل
|-
|13th
|9 September
|4° 17' 
| rowspan="2" |Virgo 
  
|Rūmāʾīl*
رومَائِيل

|ʾAl-ʿAwwāʾ
ﭐلْعَوَّاء
|m
|mīm
|40
|م
|-
|14th
|22 September
|17° 9'
|Ḥūlāʾīl*
حولَائِيل

|ʾAs-Simāk / ʾAs-Simāku ʾl-Aʿzil

ﭐلْسِّمَاك  \ ﭐلْسِّمَاكُ ﭐلأَعْزِل
|n
|nūn
|50
|ن
|-
|15th
|5 October
|0° 0' 
| rowspan="3" |Libra 
  

|Hamrākīl*
همرَاكيل

|ʾAl-Ghafr

ﭐلْغَفْر
|s
|sīn
|60
|س
|-
|16th
|18 October
|12° 51' 
|Lūmāʾīl*
لومَائِيل

|ʾAz-Zubānā
ﭐلْزُّبَانَى
|‘ (also ʿ )
|ayn
|70
|ع
|-
|17th
|31 October
|25° 43'
|Sarhamākīl*
سرهمَاكيل

|ʾAl-Iklīl / ʾAl-Iklīlu ʾl-Jab'hah
ﭐلْإِكْلِيل  \ ﭐلْإِكْلِيلُ ﭐلْجَبْهَة
|f
|fā
|80
|ف
|-
|18th
|13 November
|8° 34'
| rowspan="2" |Scorpio  
  
|ʾAhjamāʾīl* / ʾUhjamāʾīl*
اهجمَائِيل
|ʾAl-Qalb
ﭐلْقَلْب
|ṣ
|ṣād
|90
|ص
|-
|19th
|26 November
|21° 26' 
|ʿAṭrāʾīl* / ʿUṭrāʾīl*
عطرَائِيل

|ʾAsh-Shawlah
ﭐلْشَّوْلَة
|q
|qāf
|100
|ق
|-
|20th
|9 December
|4° 17' 
| rowspan="2" |Sagittarius Burju ʾl-Qaws
   
|ʾ'Amwākīl* / ʾUmwākīl*امواكيل

|ʾAn-Naʿāʾamﭐلْنَّعَائَم|r
|rāʾ
|200
|ر
|-
|21st
|22 December
|17° 9'
|Hamrāʾīl*
همرَائِيل

|ʾAl-Baldahﭐلْبَلْدَة|sh (also š)
|shīn
|300
|ش
|-
|22nd
|4 January
|0° 0'
| rowspan="3" |Capricorn 
   
|ʿAzrāʾīl

عَزْرَائِيل

|Saʿdu ʾdh-Dhābiḥ / ʾAdh-Dhābiḥسَعْدُ  ﭐلْذَّابِح \ ﭐلْذَّابِح
|t
|tāʾ
|400
|ت
|-
|23rd
|17 January
|12° 51'
|Mīkāʾīl

مِيكَائِيل

|Saʿdu ʾl-Bulʿa / ʾAl-Bulʿaسَعْدُ  ﭐلْبُلْعَ \ ﭐلْبُلْعَ
|th (also ṯ)
|thāʾ
|500
|ث
|-
|24th
|30 January
|25° 43'
|Mahkāʾīl*
مهكَائِيل

|Saʿdu ʾs-Suʿud / ʾAs-Suʿudسَعْدُ  ﭐلْسُّعُود \ ﭐلْسُّعُود
|kh (also ḫ, ḵ)
|khāʾ
|600
|خ
|-
|25th
|12 February
|8° 34' 
| rowspan="2" |Aquarius 
    
|ʾAhrāfīl* / ʾUhrāfīl*اهرَافِيل|Saʿdu ʾl-ʾAkhbiyyah / ʾAl-ʾAkhbiyyahسَعْدُ  ﭐلْأَخْبِيَّه \ ﭐلْأَخْبِيَّه
|dh (also ḏ)
|dhāl
|700
|ذ
|-
|26th
|25 February
|21° 26'
|ʿAṭkāʾīl* / ʿUṭkāʾīl*
عطكَائِيل

|Farghu ʾd-Dalū ʾl-Muqdim / ʾAl-Muqdimفَرْغُ  ﭐلْدَّلُو ﭐلْمُقْدِم \ ﭐلْمُقْدِم
|ḍ
|ḍād
|800
|ض
|-
|27th
|10 March
|4° 17' 
| rowspan="2" |Pisces 
   
|Tūrāʾīl*
تورَائِيل

|Farghu ʾd-Dalū ʾl-Muʾkhar / ʾAl-Muʾkharفَرْغُ  ﭐلْدَّلُو ﭐلْمُؤْخَر \ ﭐلْمُؤْخَر
|ẓ
|ẓāʾ
|900
|ظ
|-
|28th
|23 March
|17° 9'
|Lūkhāʾīl*
لوخَائِيل

|ʾAr-Rashāʾ / Buṭnu ʾl-Ḥūt'ﭐلْرَّشَاء \ بَطْنُ ﭐلْحُوت
|gh (also ġ, ḡ)
|ghayn
|1000
|غ
|}
Also, the following letters has no alphabetical value in numerology of the Abjad system known as "Ilm ul-ʾAdad". 

Notes of the table above in accordance to strict traditional Arab Islamic astronomy and theology:

(1) the Arabic alphabet resonates the alphabetical value in numerology of the Abjad system known as "Ilm ul-ʾAdad".(2) the ʿAmal (Islamic view of angels, equivalent to rank of the "Watcher" or "Guardian Angel") is the Angel that rules the corresponding Arabic alphabet (rhythm of the alphabet in numerology of the Abjad system), manazilu-l-qamar (lunar houses) and constellations (i.e. zodiac signs). Generally speaking, the four Archangels in Islam ace Jibrāʼīl, Mīkāʼīl, ʼIsrāfīl and Malaku-l-Maut (ʿAzrāʼīl).

(3) the alphabetical orders follows the sequence of the original abjadī'' order (أَبْجَدِي), used for lettering, derives from the order of the Phoenician alphabet, and is therefore similar to the order of other Phoenician-derived alphabets, such as the Hebrew alphabet. In this order, letters are also used as numbers, Abjad numerals, and possess the same alphanumeric code/cipher as Hebrew gematria and Greek isopsephy.

(4) those angel name with an "asterisk" needs source citation upon Arabic transliteration but the given is the closest pronunciation based upon uttering the consonants.

A few of the numerical values are different in the alternative Abjad order. For four Persian letters these values are used: 
{| class="wikitable"
!Transliteration
!Letter Name
!Letter Name in Persian
!Letter Value
!Letter(Isolation Form)
|-
|p
|pe [Voiceless bilabial stop p]
|په
|2
|پ
|-
|č / ch
|če / che [Voiceless palato-alveolar affricate t͡ʃ]
|چه
|3
|چ
|-
|ž / zh
|že / zhe [Voiced palato-alveolar sibilant ʒ]
|ژه
|7
|ژ
|-
|g
|gāf [Voiced velar stop ɡ]
|گاف
|20
|گ
|}

See also
Astrotheology

Footnotes

References

External links
 

 

Astrology
Orbit of the Moon